Reda Zeguili (born 7 January 1963) is an Algerian handball coach for the Algerian national team.

References

Living people
Algerian handball coaches
1963 births
Place of birth missing (living people)
21st-century Algerian people